Anisodontea elegans is a species in the tribe Malveae in the family Malvaceae. It is found in South Africa.

References

External links 

 Anisodontea elegans at The Plant List
 Anisodontea elegans at Tropicos

Malveae
Flora of South Africa
Plants described in 1969
Taxa named by Antonio José Cavanilles